Topoľčany District (okres Topoľčany) is a district in the Nitra Region of western Slovakia. It borders Nové Mesto nad Váhom District and Bánovce nad Bebravou District in the north, Piešťany District and Hlohovec District in the west, Partizánske District in the east and Nitra District and Zlaté Moravce District in the south.  The district in its present form was established in 1996, before that date Topoľčany district had been composed of two present districts, Topoľčany District and Partizánske District.

Municipalities
Ardanovce
Belince
Biskupová
Blesovce
Bojná
Čeľadince
Čermany
Chrabrany
Dvorany nad Nitrou
Hajná Nová Ves
Horné Chlebany
Horné Obdokovce
Horné Štitáre
Hrušovany
Jacovce
Kamanová
Koniarovce
Kovarce
Krnča
Krtovce
Krušovce
Kuzmice
Lipovník
Ludanice
Lužany
Malé Ripňany
Nemčice
Nemečky
Nitrianska Blatnica
Nitrianska Streda
Norovce
Oponice
Orešany
Podhradie
Prašice
Práznovce
Preseľany
Radošina
Rajčany
Šalgovce
Solčany
Solčianky
Súlovce
Svrbice
Tesáre
Topoľčany
Tovarníky
Tvrdomestice
Urmince
Veľké Dvorany
Veľké Ripňany
Velušovce
Vozokany
Závada

 
Districts of Slovakia
1996 establishments in Slovakia